Shining Star is the fourth live album, and fifth album overall, by the Jerry Garcia Band. A double CD, it was recorded at various concerts from 1989 to 1993.  It was released on March 21, 2001.

Critical reception
On Allmusic, Lindsay Planer wrote, "While the Grateful Dead will always be considered Jerry Garcia's primary outlet, the Jerry Garcia Band often proved the most musically satisfying of the two. Shining Star is a double-disc anthology featuring Garcia's other band, and is  entirely of cover tunes derived from concert recordings made between 1989 and 1993. The late '80s and early '90s were sporadic in terms of performance consistency for the Grateful Dead; however, 'the Jerry band' — as Deadheads refer to this aggregate — proved to be vibrant, funky, and alarmingly agile."

In The Music Box, John Metzger said, "Though the music contained on Shining Star — the latest release by the Jerry Garcia Band and the second two-disc set from the group in two months — was recorded between 1989 and 1993, it is presented in such a way as to create a 'new' concert. The seamlessness of the package is remarkable, and each track is first-rate, top-notch Garcia.... Shining Star joins 1997's How Sweet It Is and the band's 1991 self-titled double disc as essential recordings for anyone interested in Garcia's longstanding side project.   What's more — each of these packages is unique, without a single song repeated.... So, which one of the three packages is the best? Undoubtedly it's Shining Star."

Track listing
Disc One
"Shining Star" (Leo Graham, Paul Richmond)
"He Ain't Give You None" (Van Morrison)
"I Second That Emotion" (Al Cleveland, Smokey Robinson)
"Money Honey" (Jesse Stone)
"Strugglin' Man" (Jimmy Cliff)
"Russian Lullaby" (Irving Berlin)
"Everybody Needs Somebody to Love" (Bert Berns, Solomon Burke, Jerry Wexler)
Disc Two
"Let's Spend the Night Together" (Mick Jagger, Keith Richards)
"Mississippi Moon" (Peter Rowan)
"Let it Rock" (Chuck Berry)
"When the Hunter Gets Captured by the Game" (Robinson)
"Ain't No Bread in the Breadbox" (Norton Buffalo)
"Positively 4th Street" (Bob Dylan)
"The Maker" (Daniel Lanois)
"Midnight Moonlight" (Rowan)

Personnel
Jerry Garcia Band
Jerry Garcia – guitar, vocals
Gloria Jones – background vocals
John Kahn – electric bass
David Kemper – drums
Jackie LaBranch – background vocals
Melvin Seals – keyboards, organ
Production
Soundboard – John Cutler
Executive producer – Deborah Koons Garcia
Compilation producer – David Lemieux
Mastering – Jeffrey Norman
Painting, typography – Neil Osborn
Photography – Susana Millman, Robert Minkin

Notes

Jerry Garcia Band live albums
2001 live albums
Grateful Dead Records live albums